Mount Charles was an electoral division of Cornwall in the United Kingdom which returned one member to sit on Cornwall Council between 2009 and 2021. It was abolished at the 2021 local elections, being absorbed into St Austell Poltair and Mount Charles, St Austell Central and Gover, and St Austell Bethel and Holmbush 

There was also a Mount Charles division on Restormel Borough Council from 2003, and on Cornwall County Council from 2005, until both were abolished in 2009.

Cornwall Council division

Extent
Mount Charles covered the south of the town of St Austell, including the suburb of Mount Charles.

The division was technically abolished in boundary changes at the 2013 election, but this had little effect on the ward. Both before and after the boundary changes, it covered 142 hectares in total.

Election results

2017 election

2013 election

2009 election

Cornwall County Council division

Election results

2005 election

Restormel Borough Council

Election results

2003 election

2007 election

References

Electoral divisions of Cornwall Council
Electoral divisions of Cornwall County Council
St Austell